This is a list of the seasons played by Werder Bremen from 1900 when the club was represented at the founding of the German Football Association (DFB) at Leipzig to the most recent seasons. The club's achievements in all major national and international competitions as well as the top scorers are listed. The list is separated into three parts, coinciding with the three major episodes of German football:

Before 1945 the German league structure was changing rapidly. The end of World War II marks the end of this episode.
From 1945–1963 a German league structure without a nationwide league was maintained without greater changes.
Since 1963 a nationwide league, the Bundesliga, exists.

Werder have won the Bundesliga four times. The club have also won the DFB-Pokal six times, and have won one European title, the Cup Winner's Cup in 1992.

Bremen have been relegated twice, in 1979–80 and 2020–21; on both occasions, they were promoted back to the first tier at the first attempt.

Key

Key to league record:
Pld – Matches played
W – Matches won
D – Matches drawn
L – Matches lost
GF – Goals for
GA – Goals against
Pts – Points
Pos – Final position

Key to rounds:
Prel. – Preliminary round
QR1 – First qualifying round
QR2 – Second qualifying round, etc.
Inter – Intermediate round (between qualifying rounds and rounds proper)
GS – Group stage
1R – First round
2R – Second round, etc.
R64 – 1/32 Final
R32 – 1/16 Final
R16 – 1/8 Final
QF – Quarter-finals
SF – Semi-finals
F – Final
W – Winners
DNE – Did not enter

BL – Bundesliga
2BL – 2. Bundesliga
NDFM – Norddeutsche Fußballmeisterschaft

Seasons until 1933

Gauliga (1933–1945)

1945–1963

Since 1963 (foundation of Bundesliga)

Literature

References 

SV Werder Bremen
Werder Bremen
German football club statistics